This is a list of notable events in country music that took place in the year 1923.

Events 
 Country music's earliest recordings are recorded and released to the public. These include Eck Robertson's "Sally Gooden" (issued in April) and Fiddlin' John Carson's two-sided recording "Little Old Log Cabin in the Lane"/"The Old Hen Cackled and the Rooster's Going to Crow" in September.
 In addition to Fiddlin' John Carson, Henry Whitter also produces his first recordings.
 The first radio barn dance is heard on WBAP in Fort Worth, Texas.

Top Hillbilly (Country) Recordings

The following songs were extracted from records included in Joel Whitburn's Pop Memories 1890-1954, record sales reported on the "Discography of American Historical Recordings" website, and other sources as specified. Numerical rankings are approximate, they are only used as a frame of reference.

Births 
 January 5 – Sam Phillips, recording executive and Sun Records founder, who was instrumental in fusion of country music and the newly emerging rock and roll music in the 1950s (died 2003).
 January 20 – Slim Whitman, country artist best known for his high-octave falsetto and yodeling abilities, and songs such as "Indian Love Call" and "Rose Marie" (died 2013).
 February 5 – Claude King, singer/songwriter best known for his million-selling 1962 hit "Wolverton Mountain" (died 2013).
 March 25 – Bonnie Guitar, musician (died 2019).
 May 27 – Redd Stewart, lead vocalist for Pee Wee King's band, co-writer of "The Tennessee Waltz" (died 2003).
 July 9 – Molly O'Day, female singer-banjo player of the 1940s, best known for "The Tramp on the Street." (died 1987).
 August 20 – Jim Reeves, velvet-voiced "Gentleman" singer whose pop-styled songs helped define the Nashville Sound (died 1964).
 September 17 – Hank Williams, singer-songwriter and honky-tonk music pioneer (died 1953).
 December 3 – Hubert Long, music executive (died 1972).

Deaths

See also
 1923 in music
 List of years in country music

Further reading 
 Kingsbury, Paul, "Vinyl Hayride: Country Music Album Covers 1947–1989," Country Music Foundation, 2003
 Millard, Bob, "Country Music: 70 Years of America's Favorite Music," HarperCollins, New York, 1993
 Whitburn, Joel. "Top Country Songs 1944–2005 – 6th Edition." 2005.

References 

Country
Country music by year